HMAS Mavie was a 19-ton auxiliary patrol boat operated by the Royal Australian Navy (RAN) during World War II.

The wooden lugger Mavie was built at Fremantle, Western Australia in 1903.

On 12 December 1941, Mavie was seized from its Japanese owner, Jiro Muramats, as he was a citizen of a country at war with Australia. It was requisitioned by the RAN, and was renamed and commissioned for service at Darwin as the channel patrol boat HMAS Mavie, on 31 December 1941.

Mavie was attacked by Japanese aircraft in the air raids on Darwin on 19 February 1942, near the Stokes Hill Wharf in Darwin Harbour. Mavie was sunk by a near miss, although the crew of four survived. Mavie was salvaged in 1959–60 when the Fujita Salvage Company salvaged the cargo ship Neptuna, which had also been sunk in the raid.

Following a reorganisation of the RAN battle honours system, Mavies service and loss was retroactively recognised with the honour "Darwin 1942".

References

Wrecks in Darwin Waters, Tom Lewis, Wahroonga, NSW : Turton & Armstrong, 1992
For Those in Peril – A comprehensive listing of the Ships and Men of the RAN who have paid the Supreme Sacrifice in the Wars of the 20th Century, Vic Cassells, Kenthurst, NSW: Kangaroo Press, 1995

Ships sunk in the bombing of Darwin, 1942
1903 ships
Patrol vessels of the Royal Australian Navy
Maritime incidents in February 1942